The Neillsville Masonic Temple Lodge in Neillsville, Wisconsin is a building from 1928. It was listed on the National Register of Historic Places in 2004.

References

Clubhouses on the National Register of Historic Places in Wisconsin
Masonic buildings completed in 1928
Buildings and structures in Clark County, Wisconsin
Masonic buildings in Wisconsin
1928 establishments in Wisconsin
National Register of Historic Places in Clark County, Wisconsin